The Regional Councils of Italy are the elected legislative bodies of Italian regions. Their political composition is summarized in the following table. Political parties active on national level are listed; the remaining ones are included into "Others".

References